is a district located in Osaka Prefecture, Japan.

In 2009 the district had an estimated population of 34,135 and a density of 257 persons per km2. The total area is 133.05 km2.

Towns
Nose
Toyono

Districts in Osaka Prefecture